Chung On is one of the 38 constituencies in the Sha Tin District in Hong Kong.

The constituency returns one district councillor to the Sha Tin District Council, with an election every four years. The seat has been currently held by Labour Party's Yip Wing. His term will start from 1 January 2016.

Chung on constituency is loosely based on the Chung on Estate, Vista Paradiso, Oceanaire and Baycrest in Ma On Shan with estimated population of 15,840.

Councillors represented

Election results

2010s

2000s

1990s

References

Ma On Shan
Constituencies of Hong Kong
Constituencies of Sha Tin District Council
1994 establishments in Hong Kong
1999 disestablishments in Hong Kong
2003 establishments in Hong Kong
Constituencies established in 1994
Constituencies disestablished in 1999
Constituencies established in 2003